Thomas John "Spill" Spilsbury (1874–1947) was a footballer who played 57 games at left-back for Burslem Port Vale (25 in the Midland Football League, 16 in the Football League).

Career
Spilsbury played for Dresden United, before joining Burslem Port Vale in February 1897. His debut match could hardly have gone better; an 8–0 romp over Grantham Rovers at the Athletic Ground. He was a regular until January 1899, and was a member of the 1898 Staffordshire Senior Cup winning side during his run. He played 15 Second Division and two FA Cup games in the 1898–99 season, but featured just once in the 1899–1900 season and retired at the end of the 1900–01 campaign.

Career statistics
Source:

Honours
Port Vale
Staffordshire Senior Cup: 1898

References

1874 births
1947 deaths
People from Dresden, Staffordshire
English footballers
Association football fullbacks
Dresden United F.C. players
Port Vale F.C. players
Midland Football League players
English Football League players